Zagreb-Tovarnik railway is a vernacular term for a consecutive series of railways operated by Croatian Railways:

 M102 railway (Croatia), the railway connecting Zagreb Glavni Kolodvor and Dugo Selo
 M103 railway (Croatia), the railway connecting Dugo Selo and Novska
 M104 railway (Croatia), the railway connecting Novska and Tovarnik

Transport in Croatia